Watson Creek is a tributary of Mill Creek (Neshaminy Creek, Delaware River, Wrightstown Township), Bucks County, Pennsylvania., contained totally  in Buckingham Township, Bucks County, Pennsylvania flows to its confluence with Lahaska Creek to form Mill Creek. The Geographic Name Information System I.D. is 1190689, U.S. Department of the Interior Geological Survey I.D. is 02626.

History
Watson Creek was named for the Watson family. Henry Watson was the owner of a large farm at the source who had three grist mills and a sawmill.

Course
Watson Creek rises a short distance east of Doylestown Borough meandering generally south-southeast then turns and flows northeastward to Mill Creek's 6.05 river mile where it is joined by Lahaska Creek.

Geology
Appalachian Highlands Division
Piedmont Province
Gettysburg-Newark Lowland Section
Stockton Conglomerate
Stockton Formation
Beekmantown Group
Allentown Formation
Watson Creek begins in the Stockton Conglomerate, laid down during the Triassic, mineralogy includes conglomerate of quartz cobbles and boulders, and sandstone. Next, it flows through the Stockton Formation, also from the Triassic, consisting of sandstone, arkose sandstone, shale, siltstone, and mudstone. Next, it passes through the Beekmantown Group, deposited during the Ordovician, and consists of limestone and dolomite with some chert and calcite. Lastly, it meets with the Lahaska Creek in the Allentown Formation, which was deposited during the Cambrian, consisting of dolomite, limestone, chert, siltstone, with some oölites, stromatolites, and sharpstone.

Municipalities
Buckingham Township

Fishing
Watson Creek is listed as a Class D Natural Reproduction Trout Stream by the Pennsylvania Fish and Boat Commission.

Crossings and bridges

See also
List of rivers of Pennsylvania
List of rivers of the United States
List of Delaware River tributaries

References

Rivers of Pennsylvania
Rivers of Bucks County, Pennsylvania
Tributaries of the Neshaminy Creek